William Painter Farm is a historic home located at Chadds Ford Township, Delaware County, Pennsylvania. It was built in 1808, and is a two-story painted brick building with a late 19th- and an early 20th-century addition.  The home was used as a station on the Underground Railroad.

It was added to the National Register of Historic Places in 1971.

References

Houses on the Underground Railroad
Houses on the National Register of Historic Places in Pennsylvania
Houses completed in 1808
Houses in Delaware County, Pennsylvania
National Register of Historic Places in Delaware County, Pennsylvania
Chadds Ford Township, Delaware County, Pennsylvania
1808 establishments in Pennsylvania
Underground Railroad in Pennsylvania